Guy Forget defeated Pete Sampras in the final, 2–6, 7–6(7–4), 6–4 to win the singles tennis title at the 1991 Cincinnati Masters.

Stefan Edberg was the defending champion, but lost to Sampras in the quarterfinals.

Seeds
The top eight seeds received a bye to the second round.

Draw

Finals

Top half

Section 1

Section 2

Bottom half

Section 3

Section 4

References

External links
 ATP main draw
 ITF tournament edition details

Singles